Dave Formula (born David Tomlinson 11 August 1946, Whalley Range, Manchester, England), is an English keyboardist and film-soundtrack composer from Manchester, who played with the post-punk bands Magazine and Visage during the end of the 1970s and the beginning of the 1980s and in the "world music" band The Angel Brothers.

Biography

Early Years and St. Louis Union
He lived his early youth in Whalley Range, Manchester.

He worked under the name of David Tomlinson and achieved some success back in the mid-sixties with the R&B blues/soul band St. Louis Union, including appearances on Top of the Pops and in the film The Ghost Goes Gear (also featuring the Spencer Davis Group); at the time he formed the group, he was working as an apprentice television engineer. Later he was a cabaret musician and before joining Magazine, he shared a flat with record producer Martin Hannett.

Magazine
Formula was a member of Magazine, joining in 1978 after the departure of Bob Dickinson and the release of their debut single "Shot By Both Sides", until the band's breakup in 1981. His multi-layered keyboard sounds, made with equipment such as the Yamaha CP70 electric grand piano, Hammond B-3, an ARP Odyssey, a Yamaha SS30 string synth and on later albums a Prophet 5, were a defining part of the band.

Magazine reformed in February 2009 with Formula returning to play keyboards.

Visage
Formula joined New Romantic ensemble Visage with Magazine's John McGeoch and Barry Adamson in 1978; he played on their first two albums, Visage and The Anvil. He left the group in 1983 after having some differences with drummer Rusty Egan regarding the musical style of their third album.

Ludus
Formula was a performing and songwriting member of Ludus in 1982 and remained for at least five years.

The Angel Brothers
Whilst lecturing in popular music, Formula met up with Keith Angel, Dave Angel & Andy Seward which eventually led to him joining the "world music" band The Angel Brothers in 2003, playing on their two critically acclaimed albums Punjab To Pit Top and Forbidden Fruit.

Design For Living
After his stint with Magazine, he formed part of a band called Design For Living.

Solo album
In January 2007 Formula began working on a solo album. Recording has been at his own Red Bird Studios. Entitled Satellite Sweetheart, it features over 30 guest musicians. The list includes almost all the members of Magazine –  Howard Devoto, Barry Adamson, John Doyle, John McGeoch (posthumously) and Robin Simon - as well singer/ songwriter Robert Wyatt, Swing Out Sister's Corrine Drury, Dennis Rollins and Joel Purnell. The release was delayed due to Magazine's 2009 activity and the album was released in February 2010 on Wire Sound. A video of the collaboration with Howard Devoto; "Via Sacra" is on YouTube

Discography

 Satellite Sweetheart album (release February 2010)

References

External links
 Dave Formula's new recording studio, The Sweet Factory
 Dave Formula on Facebook
 Dave Formula & The Finks on Facebook
 Dave Formula's site on MySpace
 wire-sound – Dave Formula Official blog-web site
  Dave Formula Photograph 2009
[ AllMusic Guide profile]
 PunkNet '77 entry for Magazine
 [ AllMusic entry for Magazine]
 TrouserPress entry for Magazine
 band information
 David Formula interview on Melody Maker, 14 October 1978 as reproduced on the 'Shot By Both Sides' site

Musicians from Manchester
English composers
English keyboardists
English new wave musicians
Magazine (band) members
British post-punk musicians
People from Whalley Range
Living people
1946 births
Visage (band) members